The Cannatella's plump toad (Osornophryne talipes) is a species of toad in the family Bufonidae. It is found in Colombia and Ecuador. Its natural habitats are subtropical or tropical moist montane forests and subtropical or tropical high-altitude shrubland. It is threatened by habitat loss.

References

Osornophryne
Amphibians of the Andes
Amphibians of Colombia
Amphibians of Ecuador
Amphibians described in 1986
Taxonomy articles created by Polbot